Denilton Venturim Júnior known as his diminutive name Juninho (born 5 August 1992) is a Brazilian footballer of Italian descent.

Biography
Juninho is a youth product of São Paulo club Paulista F.C. He was a player for Palmeiras B in 2012 Campeonato Paulista Série A2 and 2013 Campeonato Paulista Série A3 (second and third division of São Paulo state). He also played for Palmeiras B in 2012 Copa Paulista.

Europe
In summer 2013 he was signed by Italian third division club Lumezzane. He was transformed from defensive midfielder to centre-back in pre-season camp. In January 2014 he was loaned back to Brazil for Ivinhema. Later that year he returned to Paulista F.C.

In July 2014 Juninho returned to Italy for Lumezzane. He was a player in pre-season friendlies. In mid-August 2014 he was linked to Padova. On 29 August 2014 Juninho was signed by Slovenian club ND Gorica in a 2-year contract. The deal was completed on 2 September and announced on 4 September. He was excluded from the squad on 22 January 2015, despite his contract was not yet terminated.

References

External links
 

Brazilian footballers
Paulista Futebol Clube players
Sociedade Esportiva Palmeiras players
F.C. Lumezzane V.G.Z. A.S.D. players
ND Gorica players
Association football midfielders
Brazilian expatriate footballers
Brazilian expatriate sportspeople in Slovenia
Slovenian PrvaLiga players
Brazilian expatriate sportspeople in Italy
Expatriate footballers in Italy
Expatriate footballers in Slovenia
Brazilian people of Italian descent
Footballers from São Paulo (state)
1992 births
Living people